Padeș is a commune in Gorj County, Oltenia, Romania. It is composed of eight villages: Apa Neagră, Călugareni (the commune center), Cerna-Sat, Cloșani, Motru-Sec, Orzești, Padeș and Văieni.

References

Communes in Gorj County
Localities in Oltenia